Den gröne Jägaren (meaning "The Green Hunter") is a bar and restaurant at Götgatan 64 in Södermalm,  Stockholm, Sweden. It began at a small tavern in the 1600s at Sankt Paulsgatan, near Van der Nootska Palace. It is said that Jacob Johan Anckarström ate his dinner at the Den gröne Jägaren on March 16, 1792, before he went to the Gustavian Opera House to shoot the king Gustav III.

Today's restaurant is located on the ground floor of Hellgrenska Palace and was built in 1866. On the façade there is the classic flag sign with a green clad hunter with his gun.

References

Restaurants in Stockholm
Commercial buildings completed in 1866
1866 establishments in Sweden